Rhythm on the Range is a 1936 American Western musical film directed by Norman Taurog and starring Bing Crosby, Frances Farmer, and Bob Burns. Based on a story by Mervin J. Houser, the film is about a cowboy who meets a beautiful young woman while returning from a rodeo in the east, and invites her to stay at his California ranch to experience his simple, honest way of life. Rhythm on the Range was Crosby's only Western film (apart from the remake Stagecoach, 1966) and introduced two western songs, "Empty Saddles" by Billy Hill and "I'm an Old Cowhand (From the Rio Grande)" by Johnny Mercer, the latter becoming a national hit song for Crosby. The film played a role in familiarizing its audience with the singing cowboy and Western music on a national level.

Plot
Doris Halliday (Frances Farmer), the daughter of a wealthy New York banker, is engaged to wed a rich man she doesn't love. Her Aunt Penelope (Lucile Gleason), an outspoken Arizona rancher, objects to their marriage, claiming people should only marry for love. Doris sees her point and runs away the night before the wedding. She hides out in a boxcar occupied by traveling cowboy Jeff Larabee (Bing Crosby) and his prize bull, Cuddles. Jeff and Doris take an immediate dislike to one another. Despite a few romantic moments, they fight all night as the train carries them west. The next day, while the train is paused at a station, Cuddles attacks Doris. Jeff jumps from the boxcar to save her. Just then, the train resumes its journey. As a result, Jeff, Doris, and Cuddles are now stranded. They decide to part ways, but later Doris steals a car and gives Jeff and his bull a lift to Arizona and his ranch house.

Meanwhile, Aunt Penelope and one of her cowboys, Buck (Bob Burns), take a train west. While traveling, they encounter Emma Mazda (Martha Raye), an aggressive young woman who flirts with Buck. Despite his not being interested, they get along anyway. In the meantime, Jeff and Doris arrive at his ranch house. While there, they hook up with Buck and Emma, who are now engaged. Buck suggests a double wedding, prodding Jeff, his best friend, to propose to Doris as well, but he is reluctant. And the moment they do fall in love, they are located by Aunt Penelope, who sizes up the situation and accuses Jeff of being a male gold digger. Offended and unaware of Doris's financial position, Jeff walks away. But Doris follows him, re-affirms her love, and that's all it takes. They vow to marry.

Cast
 Bing Crosby as Jeff Larabee
 Frances Farmer as Doris Halliday
 Bob Burns as Buck
 Martha Raye as Emma Mazda
 Samuel S. Hinds as Robert Halliday
 Warren Hymer as Big Brain
 Lucile Gleason as Penelope 'Penny' Ryland
 George E. Stone as Shorty
 James Burke as Wabash
 Martha Sleeper as Constance 'Connie'
 Clem Bevans as Gila Bend
 Leonid Kinskey as Mischa
 Ellen Drew as Party Guest (uncredited)
 Louis Prima (uncredited)
 Roy Rogers (uncredited)

Production

Filming locations
 Alabama Hills, Lone Pine, California, USA 
 Paramount Studios, 5555 Melrose Avenue, Hollywood, Los Angeles, California, USA (studio)
 Madison Square Garden, New York City, New York, USA

Soundtrack
 "I'm an Old Cowhand from the Rio Grande" (Johnny Mercer) performed by Bing Crosby, Leonid Kinskey, Martha Raye, Bob Burns, and Louis Prima, accompanied by The Sons of the Pioneers, including Roy Rogers
 "I Can't Escape from You" (Richard A. Whiting and Leo Robin) performed by Bing Crosby
 "Empty Saddles" (Billy Hill - from a poem by J. Keirn Brennan) performed by Bing Crosby
 "Roundup Lullaby" (Gertrude Ross / Charles Badger Clark) performed in the boxcar by Bing Crosby
 "Settle Down You Cattle" performed by Bing Crosby with Beau Baldwin
 "(If You Can't Sing It) You'll Have to Swing It (Mr. Paganini)" (Sam Coslow) performed by Martha Raye accompanied by Bob Burns on his bazooka, Louis Prima, and The Sons of the Pioneers
 "Drink It Down" (Leo Robin and Ralph Rainger) performed by Leonid Kinskey and Bing Crosby, accompanied by The Sons of the Pioneers
 "Arkansas Traveler" (Sanford Faulkner) played when the man is performing the coin trick
 "Love in Bloom" (Ralph Rainger and Leo Robin) performed by Martha Raye
 "One More Ride" (Bob Nolan) performed by The Sons of the Pioneers
 "Memories" (Richard A. Whiting and Friedrich Hollaender) performed drunkenly by Martha Raye
 "The House Jack Built for Jill" (Friedrich Hollaender / Leo Robin) was recorded for the soundtrack but omitted from the released print.

Bing Crosby recorded some of the songs for Decca Records. "I'm an Old Cowhand", "I Can't Escape from You" and "Empty Saddles" all enjoyed top 10 chart successes. Crosby's songs were included in the Bing's Hollywood series.

Reception
Frank S. Nugent, writing in The New York Times, commented:
"Bing Crosby rides a broncho, milks a wild cow, croons a lullaby to a 2,200-pound Hereford bull and has a box-car romance with a runaway heiress in his new picture at the Paramount. All of which may be interesting and amusing—in fact, it is—but we prefer to think of Rhythm on the Range as our screen introduction to Martha Raye."
 
Varietys reviewer thought:
"despite the title, the costumes and the characters, this is no western. There's very little range, but plenty of rhythm, and the latter makes it pleasant entertainment. Bing Crosby shoots par on singing and light comedy but, because of story handicap, he might have had some tough going minus the aid of a pair of new faces (Raye and Bob Burns), clicking on their first picture attempt ... Best musical sequence, and bringing the picture to a corking climax is a jam fest in the ranch house with Crosby and Miss Raye singing and truckin' to "If You Can't Sing It, You'll Have To Swing It" (Sam Coslow) and "I'm An Old Cowhand" (Johnny Mercer). Miss Raye gets in her hottest licks here. There's also some heated trumpeting by Louis Prima at this time."
 
Los Angeles Evening Herald Express
"Given a good story at last and the best support that has fallen his way in a long time, Bing Crosby hits his stride again in Rhythm on the Range, the new picture at the Paramount."

Writing for The Spectator in 1936, Graham Greene gave the film a mixed review. Observing that Crosby's character spent the majority of the film nostalgically mourning "Empty saddles in the old corral" which "by its nature [should have been portrayed as] a private emotion", Greene found Crosby's portrayal to "represent permanent, if disagreeable, human characteristics of nostalgia and self-pity". Nevertheless he summarized the film as "quite a tolerable picture with a few scenes which do deserve to be called popular cinema". Greene also praised Burns' acting as "excellent".

In his book, Singing in the Saddle, Douglas B. Green summarized Bing Crosby's impact on western music and the national interest in singing cowboys and the West during the 1930s.

Remake
The film was remade as Pardners (1956), starring Dean Martin and Jerry Lewis.

References
Citations

Bibliography

External links
 
 
 

1936 films
American black-and-white films
1930s English-language films
Films directed by Norman Taurog
Films shot in Lone Pine, California
Paramount Pictures films
American Western (genre) musical films
1930s Western (genre) musical films
1930s American films